Engarenaibor is an administrative ward in the Longido District of the Arusha Region of Tanzania. According to the 2012 census, the ward has a total population of 11,607.

References

Wards of Longido
Wards of Arusha Region